Aliabad (also Romanized as ‘Alīābād) is a village in Qarah Su Rural District, Meshgin-e Sharqi District, Meshgin Shahr County, Ardabil Province, Iran. At the 2006 census, its population was 296, in 75 families.

References 

Towns and villages in Meshgin Shahr County